The International Bottled Water Association, or IBWA, is a trade association of companies in the bottled water industry.

It promotes bottled water through events such as National Hurricane Preparedness Week.
The association fights attempts to ban or tax bottled water   and is active in other legislative and regulatory areas, including drafting bottled water regulations adopted by some state governments.

It has worked with the FDA in developing a Model Bottled Water Regulation (also known as the Model Code), providing specific guidance to bottlers on legal requirements, quality standards, monitoring procedures and labeling requirements. Members of the IBWA are required to abide by the Code.

History
Started out as the American Bottled Water Association, ABWA founded in 1958; it took on the mantel of IBWA as it grew to include international bottlers in the early 1980s.

Controversy and criticisms
Since 2011, 23 of America's national parks had ended the sale of bottled water products in a bid to become environmentally sustainable. After several months of lobbying, the Trump administration in 2017, the IBWA succeeded in ending this cessation of sales and once again allowing plastic bottled water waste to be produced inside all national parks.

Conventions
IBWA operates an annual convention and trade show.

See also 
 Australasian Bottled Water Institute (ABWI)
 List of bottled water brands
 Water management

References

External links 
 Official site

Food industry trade groups
Bottled water
Organizations established in 1958
Water organizations
1958 establishments in the United States
Water privatization